Ralph Wilbur Hood Jr. (born 1942) is an American psychologist. He serves as Leroy A. Martin Distinguished Professor of Religious Studies at the University of Tennessee at Chattanooga, where he specializes in the psychology of religion.

Life and career
Hood was born on July 12, 1942, in Denver, Colorado. He married his wife, Betsy, in 1960. Hood received his Bachelor of Science degree at University of California, Los Angeles (1964), a Master of Science degree at California State College at Los Angeles (1966), and a Doctor of Philosophy degree at University of Nevada, Reno (1968).

Hood is a former editor of the Journal for the Scientific Study of Religion (1995–1999), and has been coeditor of The International Journal for the Psychology of Religion (1992–1995) and Archiv für Religionpsychologie (2005–). Since 2014 he has been a member of the advisory board of Open Theology.

Hood was named a fellow of division 36 of the American Psychological Association (APA) in 1980 and served as its president in 1992. He was awarded the Mentor Award by the division in 1996. Hood received the William James Award from the APA in 1995 "for sustained and distinguished research in the psychology of religion". He was named a fellow of the Society for the Scientific Study of Religion in 1994 and was awarded the society's Distinguished Service Award in 2000.

Research topics
Hood's mysticism scale (M-scale), based on Walter Stace's distinction between "introverted" and "extroverted" mysticism, was developed in the 1970s, and is a well-known research instrument for mystical experiences.

Hood is also well-known for studying snake handling churches in the Appalachian Mountains. In 2008, he co-authored a highly-cited book with W. Paul Williamson covering this area of research in-depth.

Criticism

Stace's work in mystical experience has received strong criticisms for its lack of methodological rigor and its perennialist pre-assumptions. Major criticism came from Steven T. Katz in his influential series of publications on mysticism and philosophy and from Wayne Proudfoot in his Religious Experience (1985). In defense of Stace, Hood (2001) cites Robert K. C. Forman, who argues that introverted mysticism is correctly conceptualized as a common core, since it lacks all content, and is the correct basis for a perennial philosophy. Hood notes that Stace's work is a conceptual approach, based on textual studies. He posits his own work as a parallel approach, based on an empirical approach, thereby placing the conceptual claims in an empirical framework, assuming that Stace is correct in his approach.

Jacob van Belzen criticized Hood, noting that Hood validated the existence of a common core in mystical experiences, but based on a conceptual framework which presupposes the existence of such a common core: "[T]he instrument used to verify Stace's conceptualization of Stace is not independent of Stace, but based on him." Belzen also notes that religion does not stand on its own, but is embedded in a cultural context, which should be taken into account. To this criticism Hood et al. answer that universalistic tendencies in religious research "are rooted first in inductive generalizations from cross-cultural consideration of either faith or mysticism", stating that Stace sought out texts which he recognized as an expression of mystical expression, from which he created his universal core. Hood therefore concludes that Belzen "is incorrect when he claims that items were presupposed."

Publications

Articles
Hood has published numerous articles on the psychology of religion and spirituality in professional journals.

Books (author)
 
 , coauthored with Peter C. Hill and W. Paul Williamson. The book covers fundamentalism in different Christian sects, varying from Amish to Pentecostal and also investigates Islam. The authors seek to provide an experientially-based but empirically-minded psychological viewpoint on the concept of religious fundamentalism.
 . Jimmy Morrow, a church leader and serpent handler for more than 25 years, explores his lifetime of experiences from this unique form of Christian worship and reveals its history, previously unknown outside of the small communities where these rites are practiced. Hood shares insights into the social power of these practices and explains them from within a social psychological framework.
 . Hood has spent 15 years, along with W. Paul Williams, with snake handlers in Appalachia, learning about their belief systems, and has used this research to help build a psychological viewpoint on the phenomena of fundamentalism in religion.

Books (editor)

See also
 Scholarly approaches to mysticism

Notes

References

Footnotes

Bibliography

Further reading

External links
 Ralph Hood, Hood Mysticism Scale: Good Friday Experiment, Religion, and the Mystical Experience from Psilocybin, lecture (YouTube)
 Podcast interview with Hood  
 A review article From The Philosopher, Volume LXXXXIX No. 2

1942 births
20th-century American psychologists
21st-century American psychologists
Academic journal editors
American social psychologists
California State University, Los Angeles alumni
Living people
Mysticism scholars
Perennial philosophy
Psychologists of religion
University of California, Los Angeles alumni
University of Nevada, Reno alumni